A double-beam drawbridge, seesaw or folding bridge is a movable bridge . It opens by rotation about a horizontal axis  parallel to the water. Historically, the double-beam drawbridge has emerged from the drawbridge. Unlike a drawbridge, a double-beam drawbridge has counterweights, so that opening requires much less energy.

Unlike the bascule bridge, the simple drawbridge and the "oorgat" (earhole) bridge, the double-beam drawbridge has two hinges. The road surface is connected to the bottom hinge. Above the hinge is a portal, the hamei gate. A rotating arm, the balance, is attached to this hamei gate. On one side of the balance hangs the counterweight, the balance box, on the other side, the arm is connected to the tip of the bridge deck. So when the bridge goes up, the balance and the bridge deck turn parallel.

The drawback of a traditional double-beam drawbridge is that it has a limited clearance height. That is why the balance box sometimes does not hang between the two arms, but on the arms themselves, without the arms being connected to each other. So there are two balance boxes.

Many variants have been made on the basic design of the double-beam drawbridge. They are both double-rotating (with two separate bridge decks) and single-rotating and with a diagonal bridge deck. In the latter case, there is only one tower or Hamei style, which is next to the road.

The pivot point of the balance with the balance box can either fall behind the hamei gate (as in the photo), or directly above it. The latter system is referred to as an "Amsterdam type". The advantage of this is that the tower is only loaded under pressure. When the pivot point falls behind the column, the tower is loaded eccentrically; this gives both pressure and flexion.

When double-beam drawbridges are opened and closed electrically, an electric motor with a gear is often located at about half height in the Hamei styles. This engages in a rack that is hinged to the bridge deck. This construction can also be seen in the photo. The rack is often not straight, but with a curvature at the end, like a hockey stick—this is to give the electric motor time to rev up and gradually raise (and lower) the bridge.

See also 
 Bascule bridge
 Folding bridge
 Langlois Bridge, an example of a French bridge of this type, painted by Van Gogh
 Moveable bridges for a list of other moveable bridge types

Sources 

Moveable bridges
Pages translated from Dutch Wikipedia